Carrickfergus Cricket Club Ground is a cricket ground at Middle Road in Carrickfergus, Northern Ireland. It is the home of Carrickfergus Cricket Club. The Carrickfergus club moved to the ground in 1984

The ground has hosted a single List-A match which saw the Netherlands play Oman in the 2005 ICC Trophy.

In local domestic cricket, the ground is the home of Carrickfergus Cricket Club, which was established in 1868.

References

External links
Carrickfergus Cricket Club Ground on CricketArchive
Carrickfergus Cricket Club Ground on Cricinfo

Cricket grounds in Northern Ireland
Sports venues in County Antrim
Carrickfergus